Janine Lieffrig (born 12 April 1938) is a French former tennis player.

Lieffrig reached the doubles final at the 1965 Wimbledon Championships and the 1965 French Championships with compatriot Françoise Dürr. At the French, they were defeated in the final in straight sets by Margaret Court and Lesley Turner Bowrey, and at Wimbledon, they lost the final to  Maria Bueno and Billie Jean King in straight sets.

From 1963 to 1968, she competed in five editions of the Wimbledon Championships. In the singles, her best result was reaching the third round in 1968 and in the mixed doubles she reached the quarterfinals in 1963 with Boro Jovanović. In 1965, she made it to the quarterfinals of the Australian Championships partnering Dürr.

Lieffrig played for the French Federation Cup team from 1963 to 1968 and compiled a record of 12 wins and nine losses.

She played on the seniors tour representing South Africa and became World Champion in the 70+ singles category.

Grand Slam finals

Doubles: 2 (2 runners-up)

References

External links
 
 
 

1938 births
French female tennis players
Universiade medalists in tennis
Living people
Universiade silver medalists for France
Medalists at the 1959 Summer Universiade